John Robertson Proudfoot Gordon (2 February 1930 – 2000) was a Scottish football referee. He was born in Inverness.

Gordon was selected to officiate at the 1978 FIFA World Cup but was suspended later that year by the Scottish FA for improper behaviour. He, along with assistants Rollo Kyle and David McCartney, admitted to receiving gifts from A.C. Milan prior to handling their 1978 UEFA Cup clash with Levski Sofia. The Italians won the match Gordon refereed, the home leg of a second round tie, 3–0.

John Gordon died in 2000 in Dundee. He was pre-deceased by Rollo Kyle, who died after refereeing a game some 20 years previously.

References

External links
 John Gordon at WorldFootball.net

1930 births
2000 deaths
Scottish football referees
Association football controversies
1978 FIFA World Cup referees
FIFA World Cup referees
Scottish Football League referees